The 2015 season is Bunyodkors 9th season in the Uzbek League in Uzbekistan.

Club

Current technical staff

Players

Squad

Reserve squad
The following players are listed as reserve players to play in 2015 Uzbek Youth League. They are registered for 2015 Uzbek League and are eligible to play for the first team.

Transfers

Winter 2014–15

In:

Out:

Summer 2015

In:

Out:

Friendly matches

Pre-season

Competitions

Uzbek League

League table

Results summary

Results by round

Results

Uzbek Cup

Final

AFC Champions League

Play-off round

Group stage

Squad statistics

Appearances and goals

|-
|colspan="14"|Players who left Bunyodkor during the season:

|}

Goal scorers

Disciplinary Record

References

Sport in Tashkent
FC Bunyodkor seasons
Bunyodkor